The 2003 Cheltenham Gold Cup was a horse race which took place at Cheltenham on Thursday 13 March 2003. It was the 75th running of the Cheltenham Gold Cup, and it was won by the pre-race favourite Best Mate. The winner was ridden by Jim Culloty and trained by Henrietta Knight.

Best Mate became the first horse to win consecutive runnings of the Gold Cup since L'Escargot in 1970 and 1971.

Race details
 Sponsor: Tote
 Winner's prize money: £203,000.00
 Going: Good
 Number of runners: 15
 Winner's time: 6m 39.0s

Full result

* The distances between the horses are shown in lengths or shorter. nk = neck; PU = pulled-up.† Trainers are based in Great Britain unless indicated.

Winner's details
Further details of the winner, Best Mate:

 Foaled: 28 January 1995 in Ireland
 Sire: Un Desperado; Dam: Katday (Miller's Mate)
 Owner: Jim Lewis
 Breeder: Jacques Van't Hart

References
 
 sportinglife.com
 espn.go.com – "Best Mate cruises at Cheltenham" – March 13, 2003.

Cheltenham Gold Cup
 2003
Cheltenham Gold Cup
Cheltenham Gold Cup
2000s in Gloucestershire